Bjorn is a surname and a given name.

Bjorn may also refer to:

Places
 Björn (Kalix), a Swedish island and nature reserve in the Bay of Bothnia
 Bjørn, Dønna, a village in Dønna municipality in Nordland county, Norway
 Bjorne Islands, Scoresby Sound, Greenland
 Bjorne Peninsula, Ellesmere Island, Nunavut, Canada
 Björns trädgård, a public park in Stockholm, Sweden

People with the mononym
 Bjørn (floruit 856–58), Viking chieftain
 Björn (Swedish king 829)
 Björn the Eunuch (10th-century), Swedish king

Other uses
 Deutschland (1905), a 1905 whaling and sealing ship known as Bjorn between 1905 and 1909
 HSwMS Björn, an 1874 Hildur-class monitor of the Swedish navy

See also
 
 Beorn, a character in The Hobbit
 Bjarne, a given name
 Björk (disambiguation)